In India the Small Commercial Vehicle (SCV) segment was created by the launch of Tata Ace in May 2005. This category can roughly be characterized as sub 1000cc engine and less than 3.5 tons of weight. This segment competes in the prevailing three-wheeler segment on the basis of cost, durability and new pollution control laws.

Mini trucks are suitable for short intra-city deliveries, plying on narrow village roads, long highway hauls carrying small bulky loads or even heavy cargo. Before the coming of mini trucks to India, this segment was being catered by three-wheelers. With the Supreme Court of India's ban of overloading of cargo vehicles and restrictions on the entry of heavy commercial vehicles into city, the necessity of an intermediate segment was observed. Tata became the front runner to fill the gap by launching the first mini truck of India Tata Ace.

With the immense popularity of Tata Ace, many other manufacturers from three-wheeler segment or from Light Commercial Vehicle segment jumped into the SCV segment.

Mini Trucks in India

 Tata
 Tata Ace
 Tata Ace Mega
 Tata Super Ace
 Tata Ace Zip
 Piaggio
 Piaggio Ape
 Mahindra
 Mahindra Supro Maxi Truck
 Mahindra Supro Mini Truck
 Mahindra Gio
 Mahindra Imperio
 Hindustan Motors
 HM Winner
 Ashok Leyland
 Ashok Leyland Dost
 Force Motors
 Force Trump
Maruti Suzuki
 Super Carry

References 

Commercial vehicles